Princess Margaretha of Saxony, Duchess of Saxony (24 May 1840 – 15 September 1858) was the eighth child and fifth eldest daughter of King John of Saxony and his wife Princess Amalie Auguste of Bavaria and a younger sister of Kings Albert of Saxony and George of Saxony. She was born in Dresden, then in the Kingdom of Saxony.  Through her marriage to Archduke Charles Louis of Austria, Margaretha was a member of the House of Habsburg-Lorraine and an Archduchess and Princess of Austria and Princess of Hungary, Croatia, Bohemia, and Tuscany.

Marriage

Margaretha married her first cousin Archduke Charles Louis of Austria, third eldest son of Archduke Franz Karl of Austria and his wife, Princess Sophie of Bavaria, on 4 November 1856 in Dresden. The marriage was happy, but only lasted two years and remained childless.

Death
On a trip to Italy, Margaretha contracted typhoid. She died on 15 September 1858 at the age of 18 in Monza. Her heart was interred in the Hofkapelle in Innsbruck.

Ancestry

References

1840 births
1858 deaths
House of Wettin
Saxon princesses
Nobility from Dresden
Austrian princesses
Deaths from typhoid fever
German Roman Catholics
Albertine branch
Burials at the Imperial Crypt
Daughters of kings